Aan... Aharenves Loabivin is a 2002 Maldivian romantic drama film written and directed by Abdul Faththaah. Produced by Ahmed Wafau under Odiomart Productions, the film stars Ali Seezan, Sheela Najeeb, Niuma Mohamed and Aminath Rasheedha in pivotal roles.

Premise
Sara, an obedient and the only child in the family started working at an office and joined a computer training class where she meets Uzair (Zabeer) who reveals that he had been previously married to a woman Aminath (Sheereen Abdul Wahid) whom unfortunately died in labor. Sara goes to an office trip with her colleague Fazee (Neena Saleem) and a photographer, Jina (Ali Seezan) who clicked her photos without her consent. They later bonds at the trip and became friends while Jina started growing feelings towards Sara much to Suzy's (Niuma Mohamed) disappointment who is secretly in love with Jina.

Cast 
 Ali Seezan as Jina
 Sheela Najeeb as Sara
 Niuma Mohamed as Suzy
 Aminath Rasheedha as Sara's mother
 Neena Saleem as Fazee
 Haajara Abdul Kareem as Suzy's mother
 Zabeer as Uzair
 Sheereen Abdul Wahid as Aminath
 Ahmed Saeed as Ammadey
 Satthar Ibrahim Manik as Manik

Soundtrack

References

Dhivehi-language films
2002 romantic drama films
2002 films
Maldivian romantic drama films
Films directed by Abdul Faththaah